Blake Warren Bashoff (born May 30, 1981) is an American television and motion picture actor, known for his role as Moritz Stiefel in Spring Awakening. He has also appeared in a number of guest roles on television series, including the ABC series Lost as Karl Martin.

Early life 
Bashoff was born in Philadelphia, Pennsylvania, the son of Irene (Zalcman) and Kenneth "Ken" Bashoff. His family is Jewish. Bashoff started acting at the age of 10, working primarily in commercials, and then singing and dancing in film and theater. He moved to Hollywood after graduating from Washington Preparatory High School in 1999.

Career 
Bashoff had a role in the CW hit show One Tree Hill in its first season. He also appeared in Bushwhacked, Big Bully (for which he won a Young Artist Award), and The New Swiss Family Robinson in 1998. After taking a break from acting, he received a recurring role on Judging Amy, playing the character of Eric Black, an abused gay teenager. In 2000, he played the role of Jesse in You're Invited to Mary-Kate and Ashley's School Dance Party. He has since appeared in Deuces Wild and Minority Report, and has a minor recurring role in One Tree Hill. He also appeared in an episode of Charmed, "The Bare Witch Project", as Duncan, a young man who accidentally conjured Lady Godiva. Then he plays the role of Josh Cooper, a victim's son, in the seventh episode of season four in the series NCIS. In October 2006, he landed a recurring role as Karl in the television series Lost, both in the third and fourth season.

On December 18, 2007, Bashoff made his Broadway debut in the role of Moritz Stiefel in the Tony Award-winning musical Spring Awakening, replacing John Gallagher Jr. His last Broadway performance was on August 2, 2008. He was replaced on Broadway by former ensemble member and Moritz understudy Gerard Canonico. Bashoff reprised his role as Moritz on the first national tour of Spring Awakening. He ended his run with the Spring Awakening national touring cast on August 16, 2009, and was replaced by Taylor Trensch.

Bashoff also appears in the 2008 film Together Again for the First Time, which stars David Ogden Stiers and Julia Duffy. He played Mark, Peggy Olson's boyfriend, on season four of Mad Men.

Personal life 
Mostly retired from acting, Bashoff now lives on a farm with his husband.

Filmography

Film

Television

References

External links 

BroadwayWorld.com interview with Blake Bashoff, April 8, 2009
BroadwayWorld.com interview with Blake Bashoff, March 5, 2009

1981 births
Male actors from Philadelphia
American male child actors
American male film actors
American male television actors
American people of Polish-Jewish descent
Jewish American male actors
Living people
21st-century American Jews
American LGBT actors